Syamsudin Noor International Airport (Indonesian: Bandar Udara Internasional Syamsudin Noor)  is an international airport serving Banjarmasin in South Kalimantan of Indonesia. It is located in the district of Landasan Ulin, 5 kilometres west of Banjarbaru, capital of South Kalimantan and about 25 km south-east from the centre of the city of Banjarmasin, the largest city of South Kalimantan. The airport served more than 5.3 million passengers in 2017.

History

Syamsudin Noor Airport was originally named the Airports Ulin managed by the Government of Occupied Japan and is adjacent to the South of the current airport. Because it was heavily damaged by bombing by the allies, the Japanese occupation in 1944 to build a new runway parallel to the northern side of the runway being used now.

In 1948 the Dutch government (NICA) to continue the construction of the runway with a 10 cm thick stone hardening. At the time of the recognition of the sovereignty of RIS, airfield management ironwood conducted by the Local Government / Public Works Department. Furthermore, the Indonesian government in 1961, management is delegated to the Ministry of Transportation, Bureau of Civil Aviation. In 1970, Airports Ulin renamed Airports Syamsudin Noor after an Indonesian aviation hero from South Kalimantan, Syamsudin Noor (1924–1950). and in 1974 enhanced the ability of its runway constructed to accommodate other aircraft Fokker-28.

From 1975 until 1977 built a new runway being used now, which is able to accommodate aircraft type DC-9 is limited.

Based on the Joint Decree of Minister of Defense and Security / Commander of the Armed Forces, Minister of Transportation and Minister of Finance with No. KEP/30/IX/1975, No. KM/598/5/Phb-75 and No.KEP.927.A/MK/8/1975, concerning set Airports Syamsudin Noor as a civilian airfield fully occupied by the Department of Transportation.

By virtue of Decree No. KM.213 / HK207 / the un-85, dated 4 November 1985 on the term airport Syamsudin Noor converted into SYAMSUDIN NOOR AIRPORT.

Based on Government Regulation No. 48 of 1992 of 12 April 1992 on the Handover Operations Management Forum Syamsudin Noor Airport to the Angkasa Pura I and officially Syamsudin Noor Airport Banjarmasin become one of the branches of Perum Angkasa Pura I. Then, based on Government Regulation No. 5 of 1993 dated 2 January 1993, the form of companies Angkasa Pura I changed from Perum Angkasa Pura I became PT. (Persero) Angkasa Pura I.

Through the development of upgrading the runway in 1994 Syamsudin Noor Airport has been able to accommodate aircraft B-737/300 at full capacity and the Year 2003 has completed development Syamsudin Noor Airport by the government of South Kalimantan to build a facility extension of Runway to accommodate planes B-767/300 ER but its capacity is limited and the construction of apron that can accommodate seven wide-body aircraft B-737 and other supporting facilities. Syamsudin Noor Airport development in order to realize the ideals of South Kalimantan society to make Pride Airport South Kalimantan have become embarkation Hajj.

The airport is named after Syamsudin Noor, an Indonesian Air Force pilot & Indonesian nationalist from South Kalimantan. He crashed into mount Galunggung during aflight from Bandung to Tasikmalaya. His remains buried in Cikutra Heroes Cemetery, Bandung.

Development and expansion
The airport has an area of 257 hectares. The airport began operations in 1936 under the name Ulin Intl. In 1975 the airport was officially designated as a civilian airport and renamed to Syamsudin Noor Airport. After the completion of the expansion in 2004, the airport terminal can accommodate 12 aircraft including four Boeing 767-300ER. Historically, the Boeing 767-300ER was the first wide-body aircraft to land at this airport in 2004.

As the airport was running overcapacity, further development and expansion was required. In early 2013, this airport served 5.5 million passengers, whereas the capacity was only for 4.0 million passengers. In August 2012, about 58 hectares of 102 hectares (57%) of the land needed for the expansion had been acquired. The development work was predicted to be completed in late 2014. But the construction of the airport development was delayed and started in 2017 due to land acquisition problems.

Finally the terminal expansion was completed in December 2019. The airport terminal was expanded from 9,000 square meters to 77,569 square meters and is able to accommodate 10 million passengers per year. The new airport terminal began operations on 10 December 2019. The new apron can accommodate 20 aircraft (2 Boeing 747 aircraft, 2 Boeing 777 aircraft, 2 Boeing 767 aircraft, 12 Boeing 737 aircraft, and 2 ATR aircraft). The runway of the airport was also extended from 2,500×45m to 3,000×45m.

Airlines and destinations

Passenger

Hajj
During the hajj season, Syamsudin Noor Airport serves pilgrims from the region for a direct flight to Jeddah with a short stopover at Batam. A hajj terminal was built to coordinate pilgrims. In 2010, it was the busiest hajj airport in Indonesia, with the greatest number of hajj travelers.

Statistics

Ground transportation

Taxi 
Usually taxis are there until the last flight. and Taxi Service Providers Namely:
 Arya Taxi
 Kojatas Taxi
 Kopatas Taxi
 Banua Taxi
 Banjar Taxi
 Borneo Taxi
 City Transportation with the aim: Banjarmasin KM 6, Gambut, Banjarbaru, and Martapura.

Bus
Perum DAMRI operates bus routes from the Airport to Banjarmasin by medium-sized buses.

Accidents and incidents
 On 13 January 1980, McDonnell Douglas DC-9 PK-GND of Garuda Indonesia named "Brantas", was damaged beyond repair in a heavy landing. There were no injuries.
On 26 August 1980 at 06:29 local time, a Vickers Viscount of Far Eastern Air Transport opby Bouraq Indonesia Airlines (registered PK-IVS) crashed near Jakarta during a scheduled passenger flight from Banjarmasin that was operated on behalf of Bouraq, killed 31 passengers and 6 crew on board. The pilots had lost control of the aircraft over Tanjung Karawang whilst approaching Kemayoran Airport when the right elevator broke off. It was later determined that the fastenings had exceeded their lifetime by a factor of three without having been substituted during maintenance checkups. The plane was operating on a flight from Banjarmasin to Jakarta. At 06:04 the crew issued a Mayday call, stating shuddering of the airplane. Air traffic control vectored a Fokker F-28 to intercept the plane. At 06:28 the F-28 crew noticed problems with the right elevator and stated that the plane was falling to the left. After separation of the right elevator the Viscount crew lost control. It impacted the ground inverted, about 25° nose down relative to the ground and with its port wing low. The cause of this accident was the in-flight fracture of the spigot in the elevator tab circuit. This part had exceeded the 12.000 flight hours retirement life by 21.000 hrs resulting in a life of 33.000 hrs.
On 4 January 1989, a Bouraq Indonesia Airlines PK-IHA HS 748 suffered extensive damage when the pilots had to perform a belly landing at Syamsudin Noor Airport, following a failure of the landing gears with 47 passengers and five crew on board.
 On 28 August 1992, Vickers Viscount PK-IVX of Bouraq Indonesia Airlines was damaged beyond economic repair when an engine fire forced the crew to abort the take-off.
 On 16 August 2013, Garuda Indonesia Boeing 737-8U3 PK-GMH flight 532 from Jakarta suffered from nose wheel steering malfunction. The aircraft landed safely but needed to be towed off the runway.
 On 16 April 2016, ATR 72-500 PK-KSC of Kalstar Aviation flight KD931 was climbing from Banjarmasin to Kotabaru when the crew reported a fire indication in the number 1 engine. The plane returned and landed at Banjarmasin about 15 minutes later. The aircraft stopped on the runway and was evacuated. There were no injuries. Indonesia's Ministry of Transportation confirmed the aircraft suffered an engine fire indication, the engine was shut down.

References

External links
 

Airports in South Kalimantan
Banjarbaru